Samuel Olof Påhlsson (born December 17, 1977) is a Swedish former professional ice hockey player who last played with Modo Hockey of the Swedish Hockey League (SHL). Påhlsson spent the majority of his playing career in the National Hockey League (NHL) with the Boston Bruins, Anaheim Ducks, Chicago Blackhawks, Columbus Blue Jackets and Vancouver Canucks. He was originally drafted 176th overall by the Colorado Avalanche at the 1996 NHL Entry Draft, though he never played for the team.

Påhlsson won an Olympic gold medal with Sweden at the 2006 Winter Olympics in Turin, as well as a Stanley Cup the following season with Anaheim in 2007.

Playing career

Sweden
After a stint with a fourth-tier men's league based out of his hometown Ånge, Sweden, Påhlsson joined the Modo Hockey organization in 1994–95, debuting in one Elitserien game. The following season, he split his time between Modo's Elitserien and junior teams. After recording 21 points over 30 junior games and 4 points over 36 Elitserien contests, Påhlsson was selected by the Colorado Avalanche, 176th overall, in the 1996 NHL Entry Draft. Following his draft, he remained in Sweden for four more years before moving to North America to begin his NHL career. Joining Modo's Elitserien team full-time in 1996–97, he improved to 17 points over 49 games. Two seasons later, he recorded an Elitserien career-high 17 goals, 17 assists and 34 points over 50 games. During his tenure with Modo, he played alongside Daniel and Henrik Sedin, who went on to become his NHL teammates in with the Vancouver Canucks in 2012.

NHL
Following his last season with Modo in 1999–2000, Påhlsson's NHL rights were traded from the Avalanche to the Boston Bruins on March 6, 2000. He was sent to Boston, along with Brian Rolston, Martin Grenier and a first-round pick in the 2000 NHL Entry Draft, in exchange for Dave Andreychuk and Ray Bourque. Påhlsson joined the Bruins for the 2000–01 season and played 17 games with the team before being traded once again on November 18, 2000, to the Mighty Ducks of Anaheim in exchange for Andrei Nazarov and Patrick Traverse. Påhlsson completed his NHL rookie campaign with nine points over 76 games.

The 2002–03 season brought Påhlsson and the Mighty Ducks to the Stanley Cup Final, though they were defeated in seven games by the New Jersey Devils.

During the 2004–05 NHL lockout, Påhlsson returned to Sweden to play for Frölunda HC, helping the team to an Elitserien championship. With 11 points over 14 post-season games, Påhlsson was named to the Playoff All-Star Team. With Frölunda, he played on a line with fellow NHLers P. J. Axelsson and Daniel Alfredsson.

Påhlsson returned to the Ducks the next year in the 2005–06 season, where the team advanced to the Conference Finals, falling to the Edmonton Oilers. The 2006–07 season would bring the Anaheim Ducks back to the Stanley Cup Final. Since their last trip to the Finals, the Ducks' roster had changed significantly, though Påhlsson was one of the few remaining players from 2003. He was primarily utilized on the Ducks' checking line alongside Travis Moen and Rob Niedermayer. Påhlsson's efforts in a defensive role were instrumental in Anaheim's successful season; he helped the Ducks defeat the Ottawa Senators in five games to win his and the Ducks' first Stanley Cup championship. He totalled 12 points over 21 games in the playoffs, including the winning goal in Game 2 of the Finals. He was nominated for the Frank J. Selke Trophy as the NHL's best defensive forward during the regular season, ultimately losing-out to defending champion Rod Brind'Amour of the Carolina Hurricanes.

In the last year of his contract in 2008–09, Påhlsson was dealt at the NHL trade deadline on March 4, 2009, along with Logan Stephenson, to the Chicago Blackhawks in exchange for James Wisniewski and Petri Kontiola. Påhlsson advanced to the Western Conference Finals with the Blackhawks, where they were eliminated by the Detroit Red Wings. Becoming an unrestricted free agent in the off-season, Påhlsson signed a three-year contract worth an annual average value of $2.65 million with the Columbus Blue Jackets on July 1, 2009.

In a similar scenario to his trade from the Ducks three years prior, Påhlsson was once again traded the last season of his contract on February 27, 2012. He was sent to the Vancouver Canucks for defenceman Taylor Ellington and two fourth-round draft picks in 2012. Påhlsson scored his first goal as a Canuck on March 8, a game-winner against the Winnipeg Jets.

Return to Sweden
On June 18, 2012, in advance of the NHL's free agency period, Påhlsson ended his North American career to return to Sweden and signed a three-year contract to captain his original club, Modo Hockey. Upon his return to Modo, after enjoying a primarily healthy career in the NHL, Påhlsson tore his Achilles tendon, which limited him to 23 injury-affected games in the 2012–13 season.

Påhlsson captained Modo in his first two seasons in his return before taking up an alternate leadership position in his final professional season in 2014–15. He added 14 points in 53 games before ending his professional career on April 16, 2015.

International play

In 2005–06, Påhlsson played for the Swedish Olympic team at the Winter Olympics in Turin, where he won the gold medal, playing the final games with his old line mates from the year before in Frölunda.

Career statistics

Regular season and playoffs

International

Awards and honours

References

External links

1977 births
Living people
People from Ånge Municipality
People from Medelpad
Anaheim Ducks players
Boston Bruins players
Cincinnati Mighty Ducks players
Colorado Avalanche draft picks
Columbus Blue Jackets players
Frölunda HC players
Ice hockey players at the 2006 Winter Olympics
Ice hockey players at the 2010 Winter Olympics
Medalists at the 2006 Winter Olympics
Mighty Ducks of Anaheim players
Modo Hockey players
Olympic gold medalists for Sweden
Olympic ice hockey players of Sweden
Olympic medalists in ice hockey
Stanley Cup champions
Swedish expatriate ice hockey players in the United States
Swedish ice hockey centres
Vancouver Canucks players
Sportspeople from Västernorrland County